Jeffrey Dennis Talan (born 29 September 1971) is a Dutch professional football coach and former player who is the assistant coach of Almere City. He gained 8 caps for the Netherlands national football team, in which he scored once.

Club career

Den Haag
Talan began playing youth football for VV Katwijk, before moving to FC Den Haag. There, he made his debut in the Eredivisie in the 1990–91 season in the 2–0 away win over FC Volendam as a late substitute for Emiel van Eijkeren. He scored his first professional goal on 22 September 1991, opening the score in a 2–2 draw against FC Groningen. After two seasons at the highest level in which Talan made 17 appearances, the club which at that point had changed its name to ADO Den Haag suffered relegation to the Eerste Divisie after losing to Go Ahead Eagles in the relegation play-offs.

Heerenveen
After impressing at the second level with ADO for three seasons, Talan signed with Eredivisie club SC Heerenveen in the summer of 1995 after a deal with Swiss club Grasshoppers fell through. He made his debut on 15 July 1995 in the UEFA Intertoto Cup match against Hungarian club Békéscsaba, coming on as a substitute in the 74th minute for Johan Hansma. He scored his first goal for the club on 4 October in a 3–1 away win over NEC. In Heerenveen, Talan soon became a starter and as a right winger he scored regularly. On 6 April 1996, he scored his first hat-trick in a 4–2 win over FC Utrecht.

Talan made his first appearance in the UEFA Champions League on 12 September 2000, after Heerenveen had qualified for the tournament by finishing second in the Eredivisie in the 1999–2000 season. In a 3–1 loss in the first group stage game to Lyon, Talan also scored his first and only goal in the competition; a chip over goalkeeper Grégory Coupet after a through-ball by Daniel Jensen. In played in all six group stage games, as Heerenveen finished bottom.

He retired from professional football in December 2002 due to a lingering injury to his right knee. He managed a total of 201 appearances for Heerenveen, scoring 47 goals. After retiring, he played shortly for Derde Klasse club Olyphia from Noordwolde under future Heerenveen manager Johnny Jansen.

International career
On 10 October 1998, Talan made his debut for the Netherlands national team in the friendly against Peru after receiving his first call-up by new coach Frank Rijkaard. Thereby, he became the third ever Heerenveen player to appear for the national team after Abe Lenstra and Germ Hofma. In the run-up to the UEFA Euro 2000 hosted by the Netherlands and Belgium, he made 5 appearances for the national team. During the Euros, however, Talan was sidelined with a serious knee injury. After the tournament, new coach Louis van Gaal called up Talan for three 2002 FIFA World Cup qualifiers in which he scored once.

Style of play
Talan has been described as "real, almost orthodox" right winger, who was able to beat defenders one-on-one. Growing up, he modelled his play after Gerald Vanenburg.

Coaching career
Talan became youth coach with SC Heerenveen in 2010 and in 2016 he became head of the club's youth academy. From the 2019–20 season, he became assistant coach of the first team. He left the club in June 2021, after his contract expired.

On 27 June 2022, Almere City appointed Talan as assistant coach to Alex Pastoor, replacing Tim Bakens.

Personal life
His older brother Ricky Talan won the Eredivisie title with AZ '67 in 1981. He died in September 2015 at age 54 from a brain tumor.

Career statistics

Club

International 

Scores and results list Talan's goal tally first, score column indicates score after each Netherlands goal.

References

External links
 

1971 births
Living people
Footballers from Katwijk
Association football wingers
Dutch footballers
Dutch people of Indonesian descent
Netherlands international footballers
VV Katwijk players
ADO Den Haag players
SC Heerenveen players
Eredivisie players
Eerste Divisie players
SC Heerenveen non-playing staff